The 1887 Yellow River flood in Qing China began in September 1887 and killed at least 930,000 people. It was the single deadliest flood in China, making it one of the largest disasters in China by death toll.

History 
For centuries, the farmers living near the Yellow River had built dikes to contain the rivers, which over time flowed higher because, not allowed to flood, they had to deposit their silt on the riverbed. In 1887, this rising river, swollen by days of heavy rain, overcame the dikes on around 28 September, causing a massive flood. Since there is no international unit to measure a flood's strength it is usually classified by the extent of the damage done, depth of the water, and the number of casualties.

The waters of the Yellow River are generally thought to have broken through the dikes in Huayuankou, near the city of Zhengzhou in Henan province. Owing to the low-lying plains near the area, the flood spread very quickly throughout Northern China, covering an estimated , swamping agricultural settlements and commercial centers. After the flood, two million were left homeless. The resulting pandemic and lack of basic essentials claimed as many lives as those lost directly to the flood. It was one of the worst floods in history, though the later 1931 Yangtze-Huai River flood may have killed as many as four million.
The highest estimated death toll is 2,000,000.

See also

List of disasters in China by death toll

List of floods in China
List of natural disasters by death toll

References

External links 
Dealing with the Deluge, Flood! (Nova Online)

Yellow River floods
Yellow River Flood, 1887
History of Zhengzhou
Disasters in Henan